Regional Paraguaya (officially AeroRegional Paraguaya S.A.), was an regional airline based at Silvio Pettirossi International Airport, in Asuncion, Paraguay.

It officially began operations in July 2008, with chartered services.

Destinations

This is a list of planned destinations by Regional Paraguaya as at June 2009:

Asuncion (Silvio Pettirossi International Airport) hub
Ciudad del Este (Guaraní International Airport) focus city
Encarnacion (Teniente Amin Ayub Gonzalez Airport)

Fleet
The Regional Paraguaya fleet includes the following aircraft (as of March 2009):

References

External links
Regional Paraguaya
Regional Paraguaya Fleet

Defunct airlines of Paraguay
Airlines established in 2007
Airlines disestablished in 2010